Vikram Montrose is an Indian composer, singer, songwriter and Record producer in Bollywood. He is known for providing this music for the song "Kar Har Maidaan Fateh" from the 2018 film Sanju.

Early life 
Vikram Montrose was born in a Catholic family to Rama Montrose and Noel Bernard Montrose. He gained his early training in music from his mother and at his church and learned to play the piano, guitar and drums while he was still in school.

He went to St. Joseph's College Allahabad. Vikram Montrose started producing songs in 2012, during this time, he was spotted and offered a chance to compose songs for a film Hasmukh Pighal Gaya by Sanjay Dutt.

It was Sanjay Dutt who introduced Vikram Montrose to Raj Kumar Hirani for the movie Sanju. Vikram Montrose composed Kar Har Maidan Fateh and Baba Bolta has for Sanju which marked his arrival.

Career 
Vikram Montrose began his career with Sanjay Dutt's production debut film Hasmukh Pighal Gaya for which he composed the entire album. In 2016 Vikram Montrose collaborated with Sophie Choudry for a single for Venus music. In the same year 2016 Vikram Montrose gave music for Marathi movie "BHAY" for which he composed the entire Album. In 2017, Vikram Montrose composed another single "Zariya" for Zee music. Vikram Montrose followed up with another single "Bin tere Sanam", a re-creation.

Vikram Montrose debuted in Hindi film industry with Sanju in 2018 for which he composed the successful "Kar Har Maidan Fateh" and "Baba Bolta Hai’.

Sanju and the song "Kar Her Maidan Fateh" were critically and commercially successful. And Kar Har Maidan Fateh was immensely popular with the masses.

In 2019, Vikram Montrose composed three songs for Sanjay Dutt starrer Prassthanam "Haji Ali", "Chaaro Khaane Chit" and "Dil Bewda."

In 2019, Vikram also composed two songs for the successful franchise Commando 3 "Tera Baap Aaya" and "Iraade Kar Buland.”

Discography

See also 

 List of Indian film music directors 
 List of Indian composers

References

External links 

Vikram Montrose on Instagram
Vikram Montrose on Facebook

Indian record producers
Bollywood playback singers
People from Allahabad
Indian composers
Living people
1987 births